Giulio Saraceni (died August 1640) was a Roman Catholic prelate who served as Bishop of Pula (1627–1640).

Biography
On 1 March 1627, Giulio Saraceni was appointed by Pope Urban VIII as Bishop of Pula. On 19 March 1627, he was consecrated bishop by Federico Baldissera Bartolomeo Cornaro, Bishop of Bergamo with Germanicus Mantica, Titular Bishop of Famagusta, and Pace Giordano, Bishop of Trogir, serving as co-consecrators. He served as Bishop of Pula until his death in August 1640.

While bishop, he was the principal co-consecrator of: Marc'Antonio Verità, Bishop of Ossero (1633).

References

External links and additional sources
 (for Chronology of Bishops) 
 (for Chronology of Bishops) 

17th-century Roman Catholic bishops in Croatia
1640 deaths
Bishops appointed by Pope Urban VIII